Malaysian Maverick: Mahathir Mohamad in Turbulent Times is a biography of Mahathir Mohamad written by the Australian journalist Barry Wain (1944–2013) and published in 2009.

The book tells Mahathir's story from ground level, through the significant events of his life, following him from birth in 1925 to his practice as a provincial doctor, to become an outcast first-term parliamentarian to Malaysia's longest-serving prime minister, based on extensive interviews and wide-ranging research on the many facets of Malaysia's political and economic development conducted by the author. The book eschews any pretensions of being a scholarly study of Mahathir's political ideology and does not try to trace Mahathir's ideas on nationalism, capitalism, Islam, populism, and authoritarianism, described by some scholars as "Mahathirism", to the cultural, social and intellectual currents of his time. Due to the demise of the author in 2013, this book may have missed the latest and most significant twist in the Mahathir Mohammad's life, when he came out of his 15-year retirement to lead the opposition alliance in the 14th General Elections held in Malaysia on May 9, 2018, to a resounding victory over the ruling government which has held federal power for 60 years.

Early formative years

The book begins by highlighting Mahathir's early life. The book notes that unlike his predecessors in Malaysia's highest office, Mahathir was born into a lower-middle-class Malay family and did not belong to any of Malaysia's royal families. In contrast, the country's first prime minister, Tunku Abdul Rahman, was a prince as the son of the Sultan of Kedah while the second and third prime ministers, Abdul Razak Hussein and Hussein Onn, were of royal lineage. Mahathir was the youngest of nine children, born on July 10, 1925, in Seberang Perak, considered a semi-rural slum in Alor Star, Kedah, which was also home to new arrivals, such as Javanese and Sumatrans from Indonesia, Indian Muslims, and poorer Chinese. Mahathir came from a mixed ethnic background by having a grandfather who was reputed to have emigrated from Southern India. In this sense, he continued the tradition of mixed parentage of Malaysia's national leaders, as Tunku Abdul Rahman's mother was Thai, Abdul Razak Hussein traced his ancestors to the Bugis clan in Indonesia, and Hussein Onn had Turkish blood.

Mahathir's father was a teacher from the state of Penang who was recruited to open a secondary school for the sons and daughters of the sultan and local elites in Kedah. His father imposed a strict regimen at home as he famously did in the classroom, inculcating work habits and learning with mathematics and English on Mahathir and his siblings. While Mahathir attended the local Malay language primary school for boys, barefoot because his parents could not afford shoes, and took Quran reading classes after school, he excelled in his studies. With his dominant personal values of discipline, hard work, and self-improvement which he acquired from his father, Mahathir realized the rewards of striving for excellence and believed that other Malays would be successful too if they were given a chance and changed their attitudes.

Like his elder brothers, Mahathir made it to secondary school, sailing through the entrance exams and entering the Government English School founded by his father in 1908, later renamed the Sultan Abdul Hamid College. Unfortunately, none of Mahathir's sisters could attend secondary school, as all places in the girls' secondary school were taken by children of the elite. During his teenage years, Mahathir was politicized by two traumatic events: the Japanese occupation of Malaysia from 1941 to 1945 and the return of the British colonial administration of Malaysia after World War II. With schools closed during the occupation, 16-year-old Mahathir tried to earn a living by setting up a coffee stall in the local market with his friends. They sold the shop for a small profit and went on to sell bananas and more lucrative items before the war ended. Like many Malays, Mahathir's brothers were less savvy, finding it hard to make ends meet after they lost their government jobs. Mahathir concluded that if Malays were ever to enjoy decent living standards, they would need extra government help. After the war ended, the British extended citizenship freely to all races after forming the Malayan union, thus removing the advantages the Malays had long enjoyed and stripped the sultans of their traditional powers by transferring jurisdiction to the King of England. Having brought the Chinese to work in the tin mines and Indians to work in the rubber estates in the 19th century (who had become more enterprising and business sophisticated, becoming storekeepers and moneylenders while the Malays remained in rural settlements engaged in traditional subsistence agriculture and fishing), the British were about to grant control of the economy to the immigrants while making no attempt to integrate them in a new society divided by religion, language, culture, value systems, occupation, and income. Mahathir's interest in politics was stirred during the Japanese occupation as he felt that Malays were otherwise fated to live under the domination of other people ... being invaded by the Thais, paying tribute to China, submitting to Portuguese and then British colonial rule, and was influenced by reading the history of the 13 colonies and how the United States had emerged. Imbibing his newfound Malay nationalism, he lifted his aspirations beyond becoming a government clerk and felt that two professions, law and medicine, would give him the credibility to pursue a career in politics.

Education and medical practice

The book then goes on to outline, Mahathir's return to secondary school at age 20 and his graduation with high marks in December 1946. He was expecting to get a government scholarship for his application to law school (which was the choice of the country's first three prime ministers who had studied law in England). However, the British administration ignored his application during the unsettled conditions after the war, and ultimately, the federal government offered financial assistance for him to study at King Edward VII College of Medicine in Singapore. According to Dr. Mahathir, it was not a "true scholarship" as the government cut his allowance by 10 dollars when their routine assessment found out that Mahathir's father (who was living on a 90 dollar monthly pension) was sending him 10 dollars a month. At age 22, Mahathir encountered a completely different world in Singapore which he described as "so far ahead of us, very sophisticated and very rich people" and confirmed his worst fears about Malays being dispossessed of their own country. Of the 700 students in his college, 630 were non-Malays. Of the 7 Malay students in his class year, only 4 graduated as doctors. Mahathir met his wife, Siti Hasmah Mohamad Ali, the only female among the Malay students of her year, at the college. They got married in 1956. During his subsequent entry into Parliament, Mahathir would advocate for women's rights, arguing especially that women be given opportunities in education and employment.

After graduating in 1953, Dr. Mahathir spent 4 years as a government doctor in Penang and Kedah before resigning to open his private practice, while his wife worked as a government doctor for 25 years. Dr. Mahathir acquired the reputation of being a caring doctor, willing to make house calls at any hour, trudging across rice fields in the dark to treat patients. If they could not afford his fee, they settled by installments or paid what they had. Dr. Mahathir and Dr. Siti Hasmah were also involved in welfare and public health activities. He served as President of the Kedah Tuberculosis Association, visiting Indian workers on rubber plantations to treat TB, while she volunteered in the Kedah Family Planning Association. With the money from his medical practice, Dr. Mahathir indulged in his entrepreneurial streak and invested in property development, tin mining, a franchised petrol station, and a shop to do quick printing - sometimes to rescue Malay businessmen in trouble. He helped found the Malay Chamber of Commerce and served as its director. The Mahathirs grew a sizable family, having altogether 7 children, with 3 adopted. One child was a former patient that Dr. Mahathir had cured of an ailment at 6 months old. In 1984, after they had become empty-nesters when their older children went overseas for studies or gotten married, the Mahathir's adopted two Pakistani children at 9 months old and 7 months old, who were brought back from an orphanage in Pakistan by a friend.

Malay nationalism

In a newspaper article published in 1968, Dr. Mahathir foresaw a "pent-up reservoir of ill-feelings", with the potential for violence, behind the appearance of "a harmonious relationship between the races". Just over a year later, on May 13, 1969, his grim prediction came true. After a general election that upset the precarious balance of power when the Chinese-led opposition captured half of the seats in the Selangor State Assembly which could pass the rule of the state and the nation's capital into Chinese hands, racial riots broke out in the streets. Aroused by communal passions, an orgy of killing, looting and burning were carried out in Kuala Lumpur, resulting in 196 dead and 439 wounded. The day after the "May 13" incident, the king proclaimed a state of emergency, suspended parliament and a National Operations Council took over. Young Malay nationalists including Dr. Mahathir, an assistant minister, Musa Hitam, and Abdullah Ahmad, the political secretary of Abdul Razak, reached a rough consensus that the electoral results showed that the "social contract" had failed, too much was conceded to the Chinese and the country must be "returned" to the Malays. On June 17, 1969, Dr. Mahathir penned the most notorious letter in Malaysian politics, addressed to the prime minister, Tunku Abdul Rahman, and asking him to resign by claiming to convey "what the community really thinks, which is that it is high time you resigned as prime minister and head of UMNO". Copies of the letter were made and distributed throughout the country. Tunku Abdul Rahman's response to Dr. Mahathir was an ultimatum—resign or be expelled from the party. Tunku also issued an ultimatum to Razak: it was either him or Dr. Mahathir. On July 12, 1969, Dr. Mahathir was evicted from UMNO's Supreme Council to which he had been elected on an annual basis since 1965. On September 26, 1969, Dr. Mahathir was kicked out of the party altogether. His staunch ally, Musa Hitam, was forced to resign as the assistant minister to the deputy prime minister and headed abroad for study. Dr. Mahathir returned to Kedah to resume full-time practice as a doctor.

During his three years in the political wilderness, Dr. Mahathir did not lose his interest in shaping the debate on Malaysia's future, and published his most well-known book, The Malay Dilemma, in 1970. The book defined its title, "The Malay dilemma is whether they should stop trying to help themselves in order that they should be proud to be the poor citizens of a prosperous country or whether they should try to get some of the riches that this country boasts, even if it blurs the economic picture of Malaysia a little". Its answer, "The cup of Malay bitterness must be diluted. A solution must be found, an equitable solution which denies nothing to anyone and yet gives the Malay his place in the Malayan sun". Dr. Mahathir's proffered solution was "constructive protection", implying a level of support between that of leaving the Malays defenseless in the face of Chinese aggression and that of making their lives so comfortable that they would forget how to compete and progress.

Legacy of authoritarianism

The book states that although Dr. Mahathir did not murder adversaries as did some Southeast Asian strongmen, he ruled in a familiar authoritarian fashion. In his first six years as premier, starting in 1981, hundreds of detainees held under the Internal Security Act (ISA), a holdover law from the British colonial regime, were released leaving only suspected hard-core subversives in detention. Moreover, Dr. Mahathir told lawyers that he had feared arrest under ISA after being expelled from UMNO in 1969, and saw innocent allies incarcerated during UMNO's factional fighting. Following communal bickering over the appointment of non-Mandarin speaking teachers as administrators in Chinese primary schools in 1987 and a shooting rampage by an army deserter, Adam Jafaar, which killed one person and wounded others near the site of the 1969 racial riots, Dr. Mahathir returned from abroad and ordered the biggest crackdown on political dissent in Malaysia's history. In what was called Operation Lalang (which is a Malay term for useless grass), Malaysian police arrested 119 people in 1987 under the ISA which permits indefinite detention without trial. Three newspapers were closed. Although the round-up profoundly shocked the nation, Dr. Mahathir maintained that the detainees were fanning the flames of racial unrest and religious zealotry, claiming that it was preventive action to save the country from disastrous riots. Although communal critics from Democratic Action Party ("DAP") and other predominantly Chinese parties were arrested, none of the high-profile UMNO organizers and instigators, such Najib Razak, who contributed to escalating tensions were arrested. Operation Lalang also detained prominent academics and activists who were not involved in the communal dispute or the shooting incident, such as Chandra Muzaffar, 40, a political scientist who founded and led the multi-racial reform movement, Aliran, and Chee Heng Leng, 32, a university lecturer and member of the Institute of Social Analysis, who was completing her doctoral thesis on health problems among Malaysia's poor. Although the majority of the detainees were released after a few months, 49 were served with 2-year detention orders. Among the latter group was Lim Kit Siang of the DAP who worked doggedly to expose the financial scandals during the early years of Dr. Mahathir's rule and Karpal Singh, who represented Lim in a civil lawsuit against the Malaysian government in obtaining an injunction to prevent the government and an UMNO-controlled company from closing an RM3.42 billion contract, Malaysia's biggest public works project to complete the north-south highway. However, due to Dr. Mahathir's record of delivering sustained economic growth and social peace during his 22-year tenure, few Malaysians were willing to jeopardize their rising living standards, risk ostracism or explore alternatives, as the Malaysian media functioned as an amen chorus, lavishing praise on the leader.

Facing widespread international criticism, the ISA was repealed by the Malaysian government in 2011. In the latest twist of Malaysia's political history not covered by this book, Dr. Mahathir joined Lim and the opposition alliance led by Anwar Ibrahim's wife, Wan Azizah, to wrest power from the ruling party in the May 2018 elections.

Reprints of the book

According to an internet portal known as Malaysian Insider, local bookstores sold out of the book after its debut in Malaysia in April 2010, with all 500 copies sold out and additional reprints of 5,000 ordered in the same year. The Malaysian Home Ministry only approved the sale of the book in Malaysian bookstores in late April 2010 after it first launched in Asia in December 2009. This book did not spare its subject from the journalist's critical eye. However, it is meant to provide a balanced view of the man, and is not simply a bombastic recitation of financial scandals and self-dealing which occurred during Mahathir's reign at the time of the book's publication. Chapter 6 of the book discusses the financial scandals and billions that disappeared in the name of government ventures that bordered on the reckless, improbable, or criminal during the 1980s and 1990s. The country's expanding economy absorbed the shock of much of the dissipated wealth, and gaps left by the missing billions were plugged with proceeds of oil and gas exports.

References

External links
Malaysian Maverick on MPHOnline

2009 non-fiction books
Malaysian books
Malaysian biographies
Works about Malaysian politicians
Books about politics of Malaysia